"Love Spreads" is a song by British alternative rock group the Stone Roses, released on 21 November 1994 as the first single from their second album, Second Coming. The record reached number two on the UK Singles Chart, the highest peak for any song by the band, as well as number 55 on the US Billboard Hot 100 Airplay chart and number 67 on the Canadian RPM Top Singles chart. The single also reached the top 10 in Ireland and the top 20 in Sweden.

Cover art
John Squire designed the "Love Spreads" cover, using a photograph of one of the four stone cherubs on the Newport Bridge in Newport, South Wales. The cherubs on the bridge are modelled after Newport's coat of arms, which contains a cherub with winged sea lions. The cherub design was subsequently used on many pieces of Second Coming merchandise.

Lyrics and composition
"Love Spreads" is a blues rock song in D minor. Its lyrics are a telling of the Passion of Christ, reinterpreting Jesus as a black woman.

In 1995, guitarist John Squire said the lyrics were inspired by British author Rosalind Miles' 1988 book The Women's History of the World. The book examines the roles of women, their representation, and their power through history.

Critical reception
Bobby Gillespie of Primal Scream hailed the song "as the greatest comeback single ever." In May 2007, NME magazine placed "Love Spreads" at number 44 in its list of the 50 Greatest Indie Anthems Ever and said it was the band at their "take no prisoners best". AllMusic called the song a "true classic".

Music video
There are two music videos for "Love Spreads". The original UK version, directed by Mike Clark and the Stone Roses, consisted of home footage. There are scenes of Mani, Squire, and Brown dressed as a chicken, the devil, and Death respectively. These scenes were interspliced with hidden images.

Geffen and MTV were unsatisfied with the quality of the first video, so Steven Hanft at Propaganda Films directed a second video for American audiences.

Legacy

A re-recorded version of "Love Spreads" was used on The Help Album (a compilation of songs for the charity War Child). It was also used in the season 4 episode of CSI: Crime Scene Investigation, "Invisible Evidence" and in a season 5 episode of Entourage, "Return to Queens Boulevard."

The song is featured in the music videogame Guitar Hero World Tour, appearing in the final bonus set in career mode.  It is also available as a downloadable track for the music video game series Rock Band and is playable in the Classic Rock Track Pack.

Track listing
7-inch vinyl (Geffen GFS 84) Cassette (Geffen GFSC 84)
 "Love Spreads" – (5:46)
 "Your Star Will Shine" – (2:56)

12-inch vinyl (Geffen GFST 84)
 "Love Spreads" – (5:46)
 "Your Star Will Shine" – (2:56)
 "Breakout" – (6:04)
 "Groove Harder" – (4:26)

CD (Geffen GFSTD 84)
 "Love Spreads" – (5:46)
 "Your Star Will Shine" – (2:56)
 "Breakout" – (6:04)

Charts

Weekly charts

Weekly charts

Certifications

References

External links
 The Definitive Stone Roses Discography entry

The Stone Roses songs
1994 singles
1994 songs
Blues rock songs
Geffen Records singles
Number-one singles in Scotland
Songs written by John Squire